The Matins of Bruges was the nocturnal massacre of the French garrison in Bruges and their  supporters, a political faction in favour of French rule, on 18 May 1302 by the members of the local Flemish militia. It has been named "Matins" (after a monastic liturgy) in analogy to the Sicilian Vespers of 1282. The revolt led to the Battle of the Golden Spurs, which saw the Flemish militia defeat French troops on 11 July 1302.

Background
Towns in Flanders had held the exclusive rights for the importation of sheep's wool from England. This made the merchants that comprised the bourgeosie very rich and powerful, so much so that they were able to force Margaret II, the Countess of Flanders, to allow them to become autonomous communities. This put the commoners in direct conflict with the nobles in the cities. When Margaret abdicated in 1278 to her son Guy of Dampierre, the nobles sought an alliance with the French king Philip the Fair (Flanders being a vassal to France at the time). Guy, like his mother, favoured more local control of the territory and chafed at this, but the king saw an opportunity to bring a troublesome county to heel, In 1287 the alliance was complete. This led to the Franco-Flemish War in 1297, during which time royal troops took over the city, a highly unpopular action that caused widespread fear and anger among the Flemish in Bruges. Guy surrendered to Philip in 1300, and Jacques de Châtillon was appointed governor.

History
The tipping point was a visit by King Philip and Queen Joan to Bruges. The Leliaards hosted extravagant fêtes for the pair, and to defray the costs, they raised taxes on the merchant class. This was met by outrage, as the supporters of Guy, known as Clauwerts, were indignant at having to pay for the celebrations of the victors. Jacques de Châtillon brought an army of 2,000 knights to maintain order in Bruges. Rumours quickly spread that the leaders of the Clauwerts as well as their families would all be executed.

On the evening of 17 May 1302, Châtillon held a feast for his troops. Taking advantage of the fact that the knights would be tired after partying all night, at dawn the next morning, armed insurrectionists led by Pieter de Coninck and Jan Breydel entered the houses where the French were garrisoned and massacred them in their sleep using their "goedendag", a sharp pike they stuck into the victims' throats. According to tradition, to distinguish the French from the natives, they asked suspects to repeat the shibboleth: "schild en vriend, which means "shield and friend", a phrase difficult to pronounce for a French speaker. Another version suggests the alternative "des gilden vriend, "friend of the guilds". Only Châtillon, who escaped disguised as a priest after he failed to rally the garrison, and a handful of the French managed to escape with their lives. Approximately 2,000 people are estimated to have died.

After the Bruges Matins, Jan Breydel and Pieter de Coninck were celebrated as the leaders of the insurrection. Their statue, which was an initiative of Julius Sabbe, has decorated the market in Bruges since 1887.

Aftermath
Châtillon made his way to Paris to bring the news of the massacre to Philip, who vowed revenge, and sent an army of about 8,500 men to conquer the city. Meanwhile, Guy's sons John and Guy of Namur, as well as his grandson William of Jülich, raised their own army to meet the French, and the two forces clashed in the Battle of the Golden Spurs on 11 July 1302, which resulted in an unexpected victory for the Flemish.

See also
 Brussels massacre
 List of massacres in Belgium
 Massacre of Tamines
 Rape of Belgium

References

Citations

General and cited references

External links 
 

1302 in Europe
14th century in the county of Flanders
14th-century massacres
Conflicts in 1302
Franco-Flemish War
History of Bruges
Massacres in Belgium
Revolts involving Flanders